The Prison Phoenix Trust (PPT) is a charity registered in England in 1988 that offers help to prisoners through the disciplines of meditation and yoga, working with silence and the breath. The PPT encourages prisoners – and prison staff – to take up a daily practice and supports them with classes, free books and CDs, and personal correspondence. It also sends out quarterly newsletters, written mostly by inmates. The PPT is non - denominational and works with those of any religion or none.

The Trust trains and supports qualified yoga teachers for work in prisons, where they run yoga and meditation classes through substance misuse anger management education programs, paid from prison budgets.  There are 136 regular classes in 80 prisons in the UK and Ireland, 22 of them for staff. Training events for teachers are held several times a year, and on alternate years the PPT delivers a 5-day teacher, training module for the British Wheel of Yoga, called "Teaching Yoga in Prison."

The PPT has its offices in Oxford and is run by two full-time and seven part-time staff, with the help of 25 volunteers. Its Director is Sam Settle.

The PPT Scottish Link was set up in 1996 to increase the number of yoga classes in the 16 prisons in Scotland. At the end of 2009, there were 15 classes in 12 prisons and one in the Secure Medical Establishment at Carstairs State Hospital.

In 2003 The PPT Irish Link was formed to bring together the prison yoga and meditation teachers in Northern Ireland and the Republic of Ireland and to encourage the sharing of experiences. The number of classes in Ireland rose to its largest ever in 2009 with 36 classes in 15 prisons: six in Northern Ireland and 30 in the Republic.

Origins
In 1986, Ann Wetherall, the PPT's founder, was working on a research project with Sir Alister Hardy at the Religious Experience Research Centre, Oxford, investigating spiritual experiences arising from imprisonment. This involved her in correspondence with many prisoners. Stemming from these letters, Ann discovered a spiritual hunger that was not being met from other sources. It occurred to her that being shut in cells for much of the day could provide prisoners with an opportunity to turn a negative situation into a positive one. Ann believed that if prisoners could be introduced to disciplines like meditation and yoga and supported in their efforts, they might feel differently about themselves.

The Trust was founded in 1988 and supported initially by The Princes Trust and The Gulbenkian Foundation. Its work is now funded by other Trusts and individual donors. Former patrons include Sir Stephen Tumim, who was Her Majesty's Chief Inspector of Prisons from 1987 to 1995.

Patrons
 Dr Kiran Bedi IPS
 Rabbi Lionel Blue
 Dr Sheila Cassidy
 Shirley du Boulay
 Fr Laurence Freeman OSB
 Jeremy Irons
 Erwin James
 Sr Elaine MacInnes OLM
 Sir Mark Tully KBE
 Dr Benjamin Zephaniah

Responses
Erwin James, a former life prisoner, writing in his regular column in The Guardian, described the effect of the yoga class in a prison:The yoga teacher had brought peace and harmony to one of the closed prisons in which I had spent some difficult years. His gentle but determined tutoring had introduced a desperately needed method of relaxation to those who attended his class. More than that, he created a venue where case hardened prisoners could lower defences and communicate in the manner of ordinary people. His respectful attitude encouraged self-respect among his students, reminding us we were human and that it was ok to feel a mite vulnerable occasionally. I'm not sure if he ever realized it, but we took a great deal of what he taught us back to the landings and because of that I believe his good influence radiated in some measure throughout the wings.

Books and CDs
The PPT has a range of books and CDs on yoga and meditation, which are sent on request to prisoners, free of charge. These include:
 Becoming Free Through Meditation and Yoga by Sandy Chubb and Sister Elaine MacInnes published 1995 by the PPT
 Freeing the Spirit through Meditation and Yoga by Sandy Chubb, Korky Paul, and Sister Elaine MacInnes – published 2005 by the PPT  for inmates with basic reading skills.
 Clearing the Head, Relaxing the Body, Through Meditation and Yoga
 Yoga Without Words by Sandy Chubb, Korky Paul and Jo Child, 2008, The Prison Phoenix Trust 
 We're All Doing Time by Bo Lozoff, founder of the Prison-Ashram Project in the USA.

Notes

External links
 

Prison-related organizations
Charities based in Oxfordshire